Richard Herbert Taylor (born 24 January 1957) is an English former footballer who played for Huddersfield Town and York City.

He was born in Farnley Tyas and played for England Youth in the early 1970s.

He was the goalkeeper on the losing side of the 1974 Youth Cup final. Spurs won 2–1.

References

1957 births
Living people
Footballers from Huddersfield
English footballers
Association football goalkeepers
Huddersfield Town A.F.C. players
York City F.C. players
English Football League players